Bethan Nia Gammon (born 10 March 2001) is a Welsh cricketer who currently plays for Wales and Western Storm. She plays as a wicket-keeper and right-handed batter.

Early life
Gammon was born on 10 March 2001 in Pontypridd, Wales.

Domestic career
Gammon made her county debut in 2018, for Wales against Cheshire. She only played one more match that season, and did not bat or keep wicket in either. The following season, 2019, Gammon played four matches, with a high score of 14. She played four matches in the 2021 Women's Twenty20 Cup, with a high score of 20. In 2022, she was Wales' second-highest run-scorer in the 2022 Women's Twenty20 Cup with 159 runs, and made her maiden Twenty20 half-century, scoring 50 against Warwickshire.

In 2021, Gammon was named in the Western Storm squad for the upcoming season. She made her Storm debut on 28 August 2021, in a Charlotte Edwards Cup match against Northern Diamonds, and went on to play two more matches for the side that season. She was again in the Western Storm squad in 2022, but did not play a match.

References

External links

2001 births
Living people
Sportspeople from Pontypridd
Welsh women cricketers
Wales women cricketers
Western Storm cricketers